Josip Serdarušić (born 21 November 1986 in Tomislavgrad) is a Croatian footballer.

Career
Serdarušić had a spell in Iceland's second tier in 2015.

References

External links

1986 births
Living people
Sportspeople from Livno
Association football midfielders
Bosnia and Herzegovina footballers
NK Primorac 1929 players
RNK Split players
NK Dugopolje players
Knattspyrnufélag Akureyrar players
HNK Segesta players
HNK Gorica players
NK Lučko players
NK Vinogradar players
NK Croatia Zmijavci players
HŠK Posušje players
NK Bjelovar players
Croatian Football League players
First Football League (Croatia) players
1. deild karla players
Premier League of Bosnia and Herzegovina players
Second Football League (Croatia) players
Bosnia and Herzegovina expatriate footballers
Expatriate footballers in Iceland
Bosnia and Herzegovina expatriate sportspeople in Iceland
Expatriate footballers in Austria
Bosnia and Herzegovina expatriate sportspeople in Austria
Expatriate footballers in Croatia
Bosnia and Herzegovina expatriate sportspeople in Croatia